Manoj Comics was one of the leading comic book houses in India along with its competitors like Raj Comics and Diamond Comics. Other than the regular characters, the prime strength of Manoj Comics was the stories based on Kings-Queens, Prince-Princess, Demons, Dragons, Ghosts and moral values. Almost half of the Manoj Comics published comics fall in these categories. They also published illustrations for some of the world-famous stories like Gulliver's Travels, though these are very rare to find these days.

Due to changing tastes  Manoj Comics were finally closed down. Manoj Comics was the last major Indian comic book company which got shut down just before the end of the dark age of the Indian comic industry.

In 2021, Comics India announced that they will start reprinting Manoj Comics starting with character Hawaldar Bahadur.

Series 
 Bhoot-Pret Tantra-Mantra
 Bhoot-Pret Tantra-Mantra Jadoo-Tona
 Commando
 Dark Tales
 Dracula
 Jaadui-Vichitra Lok Kathayein
 Thrill Action Adventure

Important Characters
 Aakrosh
 Ajgar
 Akdu Ji - Jhagdu Ji
 Amar-Akbar
 Ajay-Vijay-Tingu
 Anguthelal
 Aslam
 Baby
 Bunty
 Chacha Paropkari Lal
 Chatur Chaudhary
 Colonel Karn
 Computer Singh
 Crookbond, a spy similar to James Bond
 Gangaram Patel aur Bulakhi Nai
 Hawaldar Bahadur
 Hawaldar Gaindaram
 Indra
 Inspector Manoj
 Jasoon Patang
 Jasoos Garamchand
 Jataayu
 Jitendra
 Kaan
 Kalapret
 Kallu
 Kanga
 Machini Lal - Afeemi Lal
 Mahabali Bheem
 Mahabali Shera
 Mahanayak Kids
 Makdirani
 Manku-Jhanku
 Ram-Rahim
 Saagar-Salim
 Shaark
 Secret Agent Sulemaan
 Sherbaaz
 Sherdil
 Shreeman Funty
 Sikander
 Space-Man
 Super-Thief Rustam
 Tinni
 Toofan
 Topchand Bandookdas
 Totan
 Trikaldev
 Uncle Charlie
 Vidhvans
 Vinaash
 Vinod-Hamid
 Yugandhar

References

External links 
  Manoj Publications
 Manoj Comics : Real Gems of Collector's Shelf at CulturePOPcorn

Indian comics
Comic book publishing companies of India